Robert Larkin Doar is an American academic, businessman, and former public administrator serving as the president of the American Enterprise Institute. His research focuses on federal and state antipoverty policies and safety net programs.

Early life and education 
Doar was born in Washington, D.C., the son of former Assistant Attorney General for Civil Rights John Doar, an instrumental figure in the American civil rights movement, and Anne Leffingwell Doar. He has one sister, Gael, and two brothers, Michael and Burke.

He attended St. Ann's School, Phillips Academy, and Princeton University, from where he graduated with an A.B. in history in 1983 after completing a 130-page senior thesis titled "'With Thoroughness and Honor' The Work of the Impeachment Inquiry Staff of the House Judiciary Committee 1974." While at Princeton, Doar was a member of the Princeton Tiger's basketball "green team", a practice squad that did not dress for competitive play. In 1981, he traveled with the team to the NCAA men's basketball tournament, where Princeton lost to BYU in the round of 48.

Career 
After graduating from Princeton, he began working at the New York City Office of Business Development, helping small businesses relocate to lower rent areas of the city. He then moved to Washington, D.C., to become deputy to the editor-in-chief of The Washington Monthly. 

He returned to New York to become editor of the Harlem Valley Times in Dutchess County, and then worked as assistant vice president of the First National Bank of Hudson Valley.

In May 1995, he became the Deputy Commissioner of the New York State Office of Temporary and Disability Assistance's Division of Child Support Enforcement. In 2003, Governor George Pataki appointed him as Commissioner of the Office of Temporary and Disability Assistance. He is a member of the board of directors of the research organization Child Trends.

Before joining AEI, he worked for Mayor Michael Bloomberg as commissioner of New York City's Human Resources Administration, overseeing the city's welfare and public assistance programs.

He was appointed to the position of Commissioner of the New York City Human Resources Administration (HRA) by Mayor Michael Bloomberg on January 8, 2007. 

Doar has testified numerous times before the United States Congress, and his writing has appeared in The Wall Street Journal, USA Today, The Hill, and National Review, among other publications.

American Enterprise Institute 
Doar has served as a co-chair of the bipartisan National Commission on Hunger and as a lead member of the AEI-Brookings Working Group on Poverty and Opportunity, which published the report titled "Opportunity, Responsibility, and Security: A Consensus Plan for Reducing Poverty and Restoring the American Dream." He is also the editor of "A Safety Net That Works: Improving Federal Programs for Low-Income Americans," an AEI publication in which experts discuss major federal public assistance programs and offer proposals for reform. In 2018, he helped convene a bipartisan working group with Brookings and Opportunity America that eventually published "Work, Skills, Community: Restoring Opportunity for the Working Class."

References

External links
 Press Release: Mayor Bloomberg Appoints Robert Doar as HRA Commissioner
An interview with Robert Doar in the IBM Business of Government Magazine
An Interview with Robert Doar in City Limits Magazine
 Meet the Commissioner on the NYC Human Resources Administration homepage.
 New York City Official Page

Living people
People from Washington, D.C.
Princeton University alumni
Princeton Tigers men's basketball players
Politicians from New York City
American men's basketball players
Year of birth missing (living people)